József Szécsényi (10 January 1932 – 19 March 2017) was a Hungarian track and field athlete, who competed in the discus throw event. He was the bronze medallist at the 1954 European Athletics Championships, becoming Hungary's second such medallist in the event after István Donogán.

Szécsényi was multiple Hungarian champion in discus (1955-1956, 1958–63, 1965). He participated in two Olympic Games (1960, 1964), reaching the final both times. He represented Hungary three times at the European Athletics Championships (1954, 1958, 1962).

He also competed as a student-athlete and was a medallist at the 1954 World Student Games, 1957 World University Games and the World Festival of Youth and Students in 1955 and 1962.

References

External links
 

1932 births
2017 deaths
Sportspeople from Csongrád-Csanád County
Hungarian male discus throwers
Olympic athletes of Hungary
Athletes (track and field) at the 1960 Summer Olympics
Athletes (track and field) at the 1964 Summer Olympics